WRLH may refer to:

 WRLH-TV, a television station (channel 24, virtual 35) licensed to Richmond, Virginia, United States
 WRLH (New Hampshire), a television station (channel 31) formerly licensed to West Lebanon, New Hampshire, United States
  in Tanah Grogot, Indonesia